The Godmother is a 2017 Argentine crime black comedy film directed, written, and produced by Hernan Aguilar. Madraza won the Best Feature Film Award in Sitges Film Festival 2017 Blood Window and won the Best Feature Film Award "Panambí de oro" at the Paraguay International Film Festival 2017.

Using visually powerful action sequences and realistic performances, the film depicts the story of a simple housewife that becomes an assassin for money. A fiction feature film about a housewife living in the slums of Buenos Aires who becomes an assassin for hire to overcome the struggles of her emotional emptiness and tough economic situation. An intelligent and romantic detective investigates the murders. Stained of sexual tension, the relationship between the Detective and Matilde is both funny and refreshing.

Madraza is a genre film that, using suspense, action and comedy, wanders through the many difficulties that citizens of Buenos Aires must endure. The film's tone tends to satirize the current social perspective of Argentina and the limits of morale and insanity.

The film was released theatrically by Buena Vista International on 25 May 2017, something rare for an independent Argentine film.

Cast 
 Loren Acuña as Matilde, a housewife from the slums of Buenos Aires that becomes an assassin.
 Gustavo Garzón as Detective, a police investigator.
 Sofía Gala as Vanina, a friend and god-daughter of Matilde
 Chunchuna Villafañe as Teresita, a high class woman.
 Osmar Nuñez as El Comisario, the sheriff.
 Monica Ayos as Agustina
 Ricardo Canaletti as himself

References

External links 
  
 
 Madraza at Facebook

2017 films
2010s crime drama films
2010s crime thriller films
2010s Spanish-language films
Argentine films about revenge
Films directed by Hernan Aguilar
Films set in Argentina
Films set in Buenos Aires
Films shot in Buenos Aires
Sitges
2017 drama films
2010s Argentine films